The following radio stations broadcast on AM frequency 750 kHz: 750 AM is classified as a United States and Canadian clear-channel frequency by the Federal Communications Commission. WSB Atlanta, KFQD Anchorage and CBGY Bonavista, Newfoundland and Labrador, share Class A status on 750 kHz.

Argentina
 LRL203 in Buenos Aires
 LRA7 in Córdoba

Canada
Stations in bold are clear-channel stations.

Mexico
 XECSI-AM in Culiacán, Sinaloa
 XEJMN-AM in Jesus Maria, Nayarit
 XETI-AM in Tempoal, Veracruz
 XEUORN-AM in Uruapan, Michoacan

United States
Stations in bold are clear-channel stations.

Venezuela
YVKS at Caracas

External links

FCC list of radio stations on 750 kHz

Lists of radio stations by frequency